was a Japanese freestyle swimmer who competed at the 1936 Olympics. He won a gold medal in 4 × 200 m freestyle relay, setting a world record. In the individual 100 m race he finished almost simultaneously with Masanori Yusa and Masaharu Taguchi and was awarded a bronze medal. Those Games were the only international competition for Arai, though he won three national titles in the 100 m and four in the 200 m freestyle between 1937 and 1940.

While serving in the Imperial Japanese Army during World War II, he was killed in action in Burma.

See also
 List of members of the International Swimming Hall of Fame

References

1916 births
1944 deaths
Japanese military personnel killed in World War II
Olympic swimmers of Japan
Olympic gold medalists for Japan
Olympic bronze medalists for Japan
Swimmers at the 1936 Summer Olympics
World record setters in swimming
Olympic bronze medalists in swimming
Rikkyo University alumni
Japanese male freestyle swimmers
Medalists at the 1936 Summer Olympics
Olympic gold medalists in swimming
Imperial Japanese Army personnel of World War II
20th-century Japanese people